David William James Murray (1901-1992) was a South African born professional footballer and coach who played for Bristol Rovers, Everton, Swindon Town, and Rochdale before becoming the coach of the Jersey official football team.

References

Bangor City F.C. players
Bristol City F.C. players
Bristol Rovers F.C. players
Everton F.C. players
Rochdale A.F.C. players
Swindon Town F.C. players
Association football forwards
1901 births
1992 deaths
South African soccer players
South African emigrants to the United Kingdom